Yevgeni Valerievich Konstantinov (born March 29, 1981) is a Russian former professional ice hockey goaltender.

Konstantinov was drafted by the Tampa Bay Lightning in the third round, 67th overall, of the 1999 NHL Entry Draft. He played in two NHL games while with the Lightning.

As a youth, he played in the 1995 Quebec International Pee-Wee Hockey Tournament with a team combined from Yaroslavl and Kharkiv.

Career statistics

Regular season and playoffs

International

References

External links

1981 births
Ak Bars Kazan players
Detroit Vipers players
HC Dynamo Moscow players
HC MVD players
Living people
Louisiana IceGators (ECHL) players
Pensacola Ice Pilots players
Russian ice hockey goaltenders
Sportspeople from Kazan
Springfield Falcons players
Tampa Bay Lightning draft picks
Tampa Bay Lightning players